The 1994 Women's Rugby World Cup was the second world cup for women. It was originally scheduled to be held in Amsterdam, Netherlands (April 10–24) but was cancelled only weeks before. However, a replacement competition was organised around the same dates in Scotland. England beat the defending champions USA 38–23 in the final.

Background
The official reason for the cancellation was that the event organisers failed to get official endorsement of the event as the "Women's World Cup" from the International Rugby Board (IRB). The minutes of the 1993 Interim meeting of the IRB state the following about the "1994 Women's International Tournament":

"The Council agreed to defer consideration of participation by member unions in the tournament until such time as a formal request is received from the organizers."

Hence not only was there uncertainty to whether it really was the "Women's World Cup" or not, but the IRB refused to endorse it regardless of its status – the "deferral" (above) was in practice a refusal to endorse as the next scheduled IRB meeting was only days before the event was due to start. It was not until 2009 that the IRB officially endorsed the event as a "world cup" when it published, for the first time, a list of previous winners.

Because of this, the Unions of some countries decided not to pay team expenses (including New Zealand, where women's rugby was by now fully integrated in the national union, and ultimately others as well) or withdrew their entries. Several team members decided to go ahead and raised the money themselves, but the surrounding uncertainty of the event status and the financial risk from teams pulling out prompted the event organizers to (rather abruptly) cancel it.

The women who had trained so hard, and had gone to much trouble raising money etc., were so disappointed at the cancellation that an alternative tournament in Scotland was soon organized. Despite the IRB threatening sanctions against unions taking part in this unendorsed event, it went ahead.

Officially it (and its predecessor in 1991) were never endorsed by the IRB the Scottish organizers did not pursue the issue. However, all of the participating teams regarded it as the "real" World Cup.

Eventually eleven of the original sixteen entrants took part – as well as New Zealand, Netherlands also withdrew from both participation as well as hosts, and Spain pulled out very late – after the groups had been drawn – and were replaced by a Scottish Students team. Italy and Germany were also notable absentees. The Soviet Union would have competed but due to their dissolution, they were replaced by Russia and Kazakhstan.

Once the event was underway it proved to be a great success, England exacting revenge for their 1991 defeat to USA, beating the defending champions 38–23 in the final.

Squads

Match Officials
J Fleming (Boroughmuir)

Pool stages

Pool A

Pool B

Pool C

Pool D

Plate competition

Round robin

Plate final

Championship

Bracket

Championship

Shield

Quarter-finals

Championship semi-finals

Shield semi-finals

Shield 3rd/4th (7th place)

Shield final (5th place)

Cup 3rd/4th place

Cup final

See also
Women's Rugby World Cup
Rugby World Cup
Rugby World Cup Sevens
Scottish Women's Rugby Union

References

External links
 Previous World Cup Women's Rugby results

 
1994
1994 rugby union tournaments for national teams
1993–94 in Scottish rugby union
International women's rugby union competitions hosted by Scotland
1994 in women's rugby union
April 1994 sports events in the United Kingdom
1994 in Scottish women's sport